İstinye is a neighbourhood in Istanbul, Turkey, on the European side of the city. It is located in the district of Sarıyer, between the neighbourhoods of Emirgan and Yeniköy, on the northwestern shore of the Bosporus strait. It is one of the finest seashore locations on the Bosporus where people walk around during the weekends. İstinye is famous for its cafés and seafood restaurants. A small bay is also among the things that make İstinye a preferred location to visit. 

In classical antiquity it was the site of a town called Lasthenes, which was later renamed as Leosthenion, corrupted to Sosthenion during the Middle Ages. The village was the site of the Michaelion, a famous church and monastery dedicated to St. Michael in Byzantine times.

Since 1995, the headquarters of the Istanbul Stock Exchange is located in İstinye. 

Additionally, the neighbourhood is in close proximity to one of Istanbul's newest shopping malls, İstinye Park, which was opened in 2007. Istinye Park aims at the high-end consumer group and is mostly dedicated to the world's famous fashion brands.

Places of interest 
 Michaelion
 Istanbul Stock Exchange
 İstinye Park

References 

Neighbourhoods of Sarıyer
Bosphorus
Fishing communities in Turkey
Restaurant districts and streets in Turkey